Sphere of influence may refer to:

Sphere of influence (astrodynamics), the area, typically spherical, around a celestial body, e.g. a star, in which that body is the biggest gravitational influence
Sphere of influence (black hole), a region around a black hole in which the gravitation of the black hole dominates that of the host bulge
Sphere of influence, an area or region over which a state or organization has significant cultural, economic, military or political influence
Sphere of influence is also a legal term in family law. A child can only be emancipated in some states when he or she goes outside of the sphere of influence of the parents, e.g. no longer needs their financial support.
Nobunaga's Ambition: Sphere of Influence, a 2013 Japanese turn-based strategy video game